The Spoornet Class 18E, Series 1 of 2000 is a South African electric locomotive.

Beginning in 2000, Spoornet embarked on a program to rebuild Class 6E1 locomotives to Class 18E, Series 1 locomotives. Most of the Class 6E1s which had previously been reclassified or modified to Class 16E or Class 17E respectively were rebuilt to Class 18E as well.

Manufacturer
The 3 kV DC Class 6E1 electric locomotive was built for the South African Railways (SAR) by Union Carriage & Wagon (UCW) in Nigel, Transvaal, with the electrical equipment supplied by the General Electric Company (GEC). Eleven series of Class 6E1 were delivered between 1969 and 1984, with altogether 960 units built. UCW did not allocate builder's numbers to the locomotives which it built for the SAR, but used the SAR unit numbers for their record keeping.

Rebuilding
The rebuilding to Class 18E, Series 1 was done by Transwerk, later renamed Transnet Rail Engineering (TRE) and then Transnet Engineering (TE), at its Koedoespoort workshops in Pretoria.

Since it was probably not intended at the beginning of the project to rebuild virtually the whole fleet of Class 6E1s to Class 18Es, most of the early rebuilds were done on the newest of the Class 6E1 fleet, Series 8 to 11. One of the reasons was that these series, numbers E1896 and up, already had an air equipment frame brake system, commonly referred to as a brake rack, similar to that intended for the Class 18E which would reduce the overall per-unit cost of rebuilding.

Another consideration was possibly that their bodywork usually required less heavy repairs than the older models in terms of rust and other damage, such as bent panels and frames.

Similar considerations possibly also applied when older Class 6E1s of Series 6 and 7 began to be rebuilt in 2003, since these units in the number range from E1646 to E1895, used the same brake valve as that of the Class 18E. The result by 2013, however, was a fleet of already ageing Class 18Es and ancient Class 6E1s, the latter mostly of Series 6 and older models.

Orientation
The Class 6E1 was a dual cab locomotive and had a roof access ladder on one side only, just to the right of the cab access door. The roof access ladder end was marked as the no. 2 end. A corridor along the centre of the locomotive connected the cabs, which are identical apart from the fact that the handbrake is located in cab 2.

The rebuilt Class 18E locomotive, on the other hand, is a single cab unit since cab 1 was stripped of all controls during the rebuilding to have additional equipment and a chemical toilet installed. Since the driving cab's noise level had to be below 85 decibels, cab 2 was selected as the Class 18E driving cab, primarily based on its lower noise level compared to cab 1, which is closer and more exposed to the compressor's noise and vibration. Another factor was the closer proximity of cab 2 to the low voltage switch panel. The fact that the handbrake was located in cab 2 was not a deciding factor, but was considered an additional benefit.

On some early rebuilds a small plate, about the size of a cigarette packet and engraved with the upgrade information was attached on the cab wall in Cab 1 next to the compressor ventilation opening. The specimen depicted is in error about the original Class 6E series, which was S11 in the case of no. E2167.

Brake systems

Air brakes
The Class 6E1 locomotives were built with an air brake system, consisting of various valves connected to each other with pipes, commonly referred to as a “bicycle frame” brake system. The compressed air pipe is run through bolster and other members and then in a zig-zag pattern under the locomotive's belly to extend its length, which allows the maximum amount of moisture to condense on the way to the reservoirs. As a result, it has multiple pipe connections. A weakness of the system was that, after an accident or even a hard coupling, these pipes tended to develop leaks at the joints which were extremely difficult to repair.

When Class 6E1, Series 7 and earlier locomotives began to be rebuilt, it was necessary to retrofit them with a brake equipment frame or brake rack. Since this already increased the per-unit rebuilding cost, it was decided to simultaneously re-route the compressor pipe away from bolster and other members to the outside of the bodywork on the locomotive's right side, from below and to the right of the cab door to just before the second sandbox lid from the rear end. An added advantage was that the pipe would run cooler and more moisture would condense on the way to the reservoirs. The same modification was not done on locomotives which were rebuilt from Class 6E1, Series 8 and later.

Dynamic brakes
The Class 6E1 locomotives were equipped with regenerative brakes. With regenerative braking, the energy generated by the traction motors is dissipated by the resistor grid banks at the substations, when it is not absorbed by other locomotives in the same electrical section. A stumbling block was that the regeneration equipment at many of the sub-stations along the route was unreliable. Since there was no guarantee that another train would be in the same section to absorb the regenerated energy, there was always the risk that line voltage could exceed 4.1 kV, which would make either the sub-station or the locomotive trip out.

As a result, the rebuilt Class 18E locomotives were equipped with rheostatic braking instead of regenerative braking. With rheostatic braking, the energy generated by the traction motors is dissipated by the resistor grids on the locomotive itself. The rheostatic braking of the Class 18E was superior and very reliable for higher speed trains, compared with the regenerative braking of the older Classes 6E1 and 17E locomotives.

Bogies

The Class 6E1 was built with sophisticated traction linkages on their bogies. Together with the locomotive's electronic wheel-slip detection system, these traction struts, mounted between the linkages on the bogies and the locomotive body and colloquially referred to as grasshopper legs, ensure the maximum transfer of power to the rails without causing wheel-slip by reducing the adhesion of the leading bogie and increasing that of the trailing bogie by as much as 15% upon starting.

During rebuilding, all bogies and traction motors underwent a complete refurbishment. Traction motors were tested back-to-back to ensure quality.

New equipment
The rebuilding included the installation of Alstom micro-processor control technology. New equipment in the totally refurbished Class 18E locomotive include the following:
 A transducer to relay vacuum and compressed air pressure to an electric signal.
 Dual-purpose main resistance modules which replaced the accelerating resistance system and which are used for motoring and rheostatic braking. The resistance blowers use AC motors which are powered through inverters.
 A DC current transformer (DCCT) which measures the current flowing to and from certain equipment, such as the traction motors or total overhead line current.
 A potential divider to measure the voltage in the overhead equipment and traction motors.
 A main processor unit (MPU) located in high tension compartment 1, used for primary (master) control of the locomotive.
 Remote input-output modules (RIOM) located in high tension compartment 2, in the low tension panel and the driving compartment, used for secondary (slave) control of the locomotive.
 Two digital display units (DDU) mounted on the driving console to display, for example information like speed, current draw and available overhead voltage, current draw of the traction motors in each bogie, rheostatic braking current generated per bogie, as well as performance information about all the locomotives in the consisted set.
 The driver's cab and console received a lot of attention to ensure crew comfort and safety. It included the installation of an air conditioner and windows which offer better protection against rocks thrown by trackside vagrants.

Batteries
Beginning in 2009, in an attempt to reduce theft, the 110 V battery bank was relocated from the locomotive sides below the frame and between the bogies to cab 1, where the toilet occupied less than half of the available space. This appears to have been done only with numbers  and later. Identifying features are a small grille to the left of the bottom of the cab 1 side door and, in most cases, the remaining battery box frames without side covers.

Appearance

Identifying features
The most obvious visual feature to distinguish the Class 18E from the Class 6E1 is the filled-in driver's windows at the rear end, where the toilet is installed. On the first rebuilds, as observed up to no. , the small driver's side window was left in place as a toilet window, but most of these have since also been filled in. The remaining rear windscreen still has the slanted upper edge of the 6E1 windscreens, but the new front windscreens on the Class 18E are rectangular.

On the sides, obvious visual distinctions from the Class 6E1 are the left one of the two large grilles which was removed, with the opening filled in, two new large grilles which are installed in the centre lower sides to serve as air intakes for the rheostatic braking resistance blowers, and a large access door to one of the high-tension compartments, which is installed in place of the rightmost small window which was in the upper side of the Class 6E1. On some Class 18E locomotives, one or more of the remaining small windows were slightly enlarged vertically. On the left side, the air intakes for the air conditioner in the cab are installed between the top three steps of the roof access ladder.

Locomotives which were rebuilt from Class 6E1, Series 6 and 7, have part of the compressed air piping sunk into a recess which runs along the rear of the lower edge of the body on the locomotive's right side, the side opposite the roof access ladder side. On locomotives which were rebuilt from Class 6E1, Series 8 to 11 this pipe was not rerouted.

Lineage identification
All features which distinguished Class 6E1, Series 6 to 11 locomotives from each other, are still present on the Class 18E rebuilds, making it possible to visually determine the Class 6E1 origin of most Class 18E locomotives. Examples are shown in the pictures below.
 The smooth sides of ex Series 6 and 7 locomotives and, on the Class 18Es rebuilt from them, the recessed compressed air pipe on the right side.
 The rainwater beading above the small grilles immediately to the right of the side door, which was only installed on Series 6 and later Class 6E1s.
 The large hatch door on each side, below the second small window to the right of the side door on the roof access ladder side, and below the first window immediately to the right of the door on the opposite side, on ex Series 8 to 11 locomotives.
 The rainwater downpipe drainage holes on the lower sides of ex Series 9 to 11 locomotives. As on the pre-rebuilt locomotives, these holes are usually covered by so-called buckets, but these covers are absent on several units.
 The end doors, which are flush with the doorframes on ex Series 6 to 8 locomotives, and recessed into the doorframes on ex Series 9 to 11 locomotives;
 The small side window on the driver's assistant's side, which was omitted on ex Series 9 to 11 locomotives;
 The squared corners on all doors on ex Series 6 to 8 locomotives, with a weather strip at the bottom, and the rounded corners and no weather strips on all doors on ex Series 9 to 11 locomotives;
 The side doors with:
 mid-door mounted door handles on ex Series 6 and early Series 7 locomotives; 
 low-mounted handles with a drawer pull type handle at mid-door level on ex later Series 7 and Series 8 locomotives; and
 two interconnected latch handles on the outside, one handle mounted near floor level and the other at mid-door level, on ex Class 6E1 Series 9 to 11 locomotives.

Operation
The locomotive is controlled via resistors over which the voltage is dropped in a configuration of series and parallel electrical circuits. The circuit breakers which switch these circuits, work under very high power and voltage and are all pneumatically operated for insulation purposes. Compressed air is required to open or close the switch actions and air is also used for the weak field Cam Switch, which also switches under very high currents.

Upon starting and in the low notches, the major part of the voltage is dropped over the banks of resistors and all four traction motors are in series. As the driver notches up, some of the resistor banks are cut out via the pneumatically operated switches and the voltage increases across the traction motors. The more resistors which are cut out as the driver notches higher, the more power is developed by the traction motors. At around  the locomotive switches to a parallel combination, where the two traction motors per bogie are in a series electrical circuit, while the two bogies are in parallel electrical circuit. Eventually, when all resistors are cut out, the locomotive is operating in full-field.

The locomotives in a consisted set are switched between series and parallel mode automatically, based on speed, overhead voltage and electromotive force (EMF). The driver can select "series hold" to force some or all of the locomotives in the consisted set to remain in series mode when overhead voltage is low. If nothing is done, some of the locomotives will switch off under low overhead voltage conditions, to prevent damage to resistors, and switch on again when the voltage improves.

Table of rebuilds
The table lists the original Class 6E1 number, series and year built for each Class 18E, Series 1 locomotive, as well as the year it was rebuilt to Class 18E. All the table columns are sortable.

Illustration
The Class 6E1 series lineage identification features, as well as the liveries which were applied to these locomotives, are illustrated in the following pictures. Note the external compressed air pipe on the right side of locomotives rebuilt from Class 6E1, Series 6 and 7.
Rebuilt from Class 6E1, Series 6

Rebuilt from Class 6E1, Series 7

Rebuilt from Class 6E1, Series 8

Rebuilt from Class 6E1, Series 9

Rebuilt from Class 6E1, Series 10

Rebuilt from Class 6E1, Series 11

References

External links

Bo-Bo locomotives
Cape gauge railway locomotives
Electric locomotives of South Africa
Railway locomotives introduced in 2000
Transnet Rail Engineering locomotives
Union Carriage & Wagon locomotives